The Jefferson Carnegie Library is a library in Jefferson, Texas, built with money donated by Scottish-American businessman and philanthropist Andrew Carnegie.  Hallett & Rawson of Des Moines were the architects. Built in 1907, it is one of four libraries in Texas, from the original 34, to currently operate as a library.

History
The ladies of the Jefferson Library Association proposed that a restroom be built and that the fees generated by its use pay for library services. Also, a ten-cent tea was planned at the building the library was occupying on Walnut Street, and proceeds were designated for buying a badly needed bookcase for the two hundred volume collection.  Both of these ideas did not work, so in 1907, the library association received a grant from Andrew Carnegie for $7,500 to build a library on the condition that the city appropriate a budget for its upkeep.

Continuing legacy
In 2007, the library began a restoration project which was recognized by the Lucille Terry Award.

See also 
List of Carnegie libraries in the United States

References

External links
 Jefferson Carnegie Library 

Carnegie libraries in Texas
Jefferson, Texas
Buildings and structures in Marion County, Texas
Library buildings completed in 1907
1907 establishments in Texas
Education in Marion County, Texas
Neoclassical architecture in Texas